This is a list of the 179 members of the Parliament of Denmark in the 2022 session. They were elected at the 2022 Danish general election.

Election results

Seat distribution

Below is the distribution of the 179 seats as it appeared after the 2022 election, as well as the current distribution.

Parliament members elected at the November 2022 election 

The list of new or re-elected parliament members.

Party and member changes after the November 2022 elections

Party changes 
Below are all parliament members that have joined another party or become independent during the term.

Lasting member changes 
Below are member changes that will last through the entire term.

Temporary member changes 
Below are temporary member replacements during the term.

Notes

References 

2022-2026
Denmark